Kim Ko-am (김고암, born 14 September 1943) is a North Korean cross-country skier. He competed in the men's 30 kilometre event at the 1964 Winter Olympics.

References

External links
 

1943 births
Living people
North Korean male cross-country skiers
Olympic cross-country skiers of North Korea
Cross-country skiers at the 1964 Winter Olympics
People from South Pyongan